This is a list of the Friday mosques for which the Ottoman architect Mimar Sinan claimed responsibility in his autobiographies. Of the 77 mosques in the list, 39 are in Istanbul.

Background
Mimar Sinan was appointed to the post of chief Ottoman  architect by the grand vizier Ayas Mehmed Pasha in 1539. Sinan occupied the position until his death in 1588 and served under three sultans: Süleyman I (ruled 1520–66), Selim II (ruled 1566–74) and Murad III (ruled 1574–95). In his autobiography Biographical Memoir of Construction (Teẕkiretü’l-bünyān), Sinan claimed to have designed 698 building including 80 Friday mosques and more than 400 smaller community mosques (masjids). In reality he led a team of royal architects and the buildings would have been collective works. Sinan himself would have been occupied with the large building projects undertaken for the sultan. These were the Şehzade Mosque (1543–48), the Süleymaniye Mosque (1548–59), the Kirkçeşme waterworks (1561–65), the Büyükçekmece bridge (1565–67) and the Selimiye Mosque in Edirne (1568–74). After this date, during the rule of Murad III, there were no major construction projects and as an old man he would have entrusted the work to other architects.

The following list of 77 Friday mosques was compiled by the historian Gülru Necipoğlu. It is based on the lists appended to two of Sinan's autobiographies: Gift of the Architects (Tuḥfetü’l-miʿmārīn) and Biographical Memoir of Buildings (Teẕkiretü’l-ebniye). The list excludes older mosques that Sinan renovated and those converted into Friday mosques from older community mosques.

Chronological list of Friday mosques

See also
 List of mosques commissioned by the Ottoman dynasty

References

Sources

Further reading

Mimar Sinan buildings
Grand mosques